Seruyan Regency is one of the thirteen regencies which comprise the Central Kalimantan Province on the island of Kalimantan (Borneo), Indonesia. The town of Kuala Pembuang in Seruyan Hilir District is the capital of Seruyan Regency. The population of the Regency was 139,931 at the 2010 Census and 162,906 at the 2020 census; the official estimate was at mid 2021 was 164,378.

History 

 In 1787, the Pambuang Banjar area which was part of the Banjar Sultanate was handed over by Sunan Nata Alam to the VOC Netherlands. The area was then formed into a district named Van Pemboewan.
 After Van Pemboewan ended in 1946 and was replaced by Great Dayak, a district was formed with the name Seruyan district.
 Seruyan district Government in 1946. The "Onderdistrictshoofd" government was changed to a District under the name Seruyan District with its capital city being Kuala Pembuang.
 1947. This year the Seruyan District area was divided into two districts, namely: Seruyan Hilir District with the capital city of Kuala Pembuang and being the legal territory of Kawedanan Sampit Barat, Seruyan Hulu District with the capital in overseas Pulut and becoming the legal territory of Kawedanan Sampit North.
 The Seruyan area at that time was included in the Level I Province of South Kalimantan (before the Province of Central Kalimantan was formed in 1957) and in the Level II Regency of Kotawaringin (before it was divided into 2 regencies of East Kotawaringin and West Kotawaringin).
 1958. The Seruyan Hulu District was divided into two districts, namely: Central Seruyan District with its capital at Rantau Pulut, and Seruyan Hulu District with its capital at Tumbang Manjul.
 1961. The Seruyan Hilir district was divided into two districts, namely: Seruyan Hilir District with its capital at Kuala Pembuang and Hanau District with its capital at Pembuang Hulu.
 1963. The Seruyan Hilir sub-district was divided into two districts, namely: Seruyan Hilir District with its capital at Kuala Pembuang and the Danau Sembuluh District with its capital at Telaga Pulang.
 Seruyan Kawedanan Administration in 1963. With the rapid development of the division of several districts, then with the Decree of the Governor of the First Level Region of Central Kalimantan Number: 06/Pem.330-c-2-3/1963 dated June 1, 1963 concerning the Determination of Kawedanan fun. Kawedanan Seruyan oversees five districts with its capital city Kuala Pembuang. 
 Among the five districts are: Seruyan Hilir District with its capital at Kuala Pembuang, Danau Sembuluh District with its capital at Telaga Pulang, Hanau District with its capital at Pembuang Hulu, and Seruyan Tengah District with its capital at Rantau Pulut.
 Government of the Seruyan Level II Preparatory Region in 1965. With some changes in the Government Organizational Structure, with the issuance of the Decree of the Governor of the Head of the Level I Region of Central Kalimantan No: 05/Pem.232-c-2-4/1965 dated May 1, 1965 concerning Stipulation Seruyan Level II Preparatory Region. 
 In connection with this, the status of the Seruyan Kawedanan Government changed to a Seruyan Level II Preparatory District with its capital at Kuala Pembuang. The Government of the East Kotawaringin Seruyan Region was formed based on: Minister of Home Affairs Decree Number 64 of 1979 dated 28 April 1979 concerning the Establishment of the Assistant Regent of Kapuas for the Gunung Mas Region, the Assistant Regent of East Kotawaringin for the Katingan Region, the Assistant Regent of East Kotawaringin for the Seruyan Region, the Assistant Regent of East Kotawaringin for the Seruyan Region. North Barito Regent for Murung Raya Region, Assistant South Barito Regent for East Barito Region, Decree of the Governor of the First Level Region of Central Kalimantan Number: 148/KPTS/1979 dated 28 June 1979 concerning the Elimination of the Status of the Region and Level II Administrative Office of Gunung Mas, Katingan, Murung Raya and East Barito as well as the Status of the Seruyan Region and Preparatory Office for Level II Regions, and the Decree of the Governor of the Head of the Level I Region of Central Kalimantan Number: 247/KPTS/1980 dated July 2, 1980 concerning Organizational Structure and Work Procedures of the Assistant Office of the East Kotawaringin Regent for the Fun Region an. The Administration of the Assistant Regent of the Regent (TUBUP) of the East Kotawaringin Seruyan Region with the capital domiciled at Kuala Pembuang.
 The Seruyan Regency Government was established based on Law Number 5 of 2002 concerning the Establishment of Katingan Regency, Seruyan Regency, Sukamara Regency, Lamandau Regency, Gunung Mas Regency, Pulang Pisau Regency, Murung Raya Regency and East Barito Regency in Central Kalimantan Province, which was inaugurated by the Minister of Home Affairs on behalf of the President of the Republic of Indonesia on July 2, 2002 in Jakarta. The capital of Seruyan Regency is Kuala Pembuang, Seruyan Hilir District under the Temporary Leader, Loper Anggus.
 The election of Darwan Ali as the first regent of Seruyan Regency started a new chapter for this Regency. Under Darwan Ali's leadership, a large number of Seruyan areas were built and renovated.

Administrative Districts 
At the 2010 Census, Seruyan Regency consisted of five districts (kecamatan), but subsequently each of these districts was split in two. The consequent ten districts are tabulated below with their areas and population totals from the 2010 Census and the 2020 Census, together with the official estimate as at mid 2021. The table also includes the location of the district's administrative centre, the number of administrative villages (rural desa and urban kelurahan) in each district, and its postal codes. 

Note: (a) the 2010 population of this new District is included in the figure for the district immediately preceding it in the table.

Transports 
The regency is served by the Seruyan Kuala Pembuang Airport .

References

External links 

 

Regencies of Central Kalimantan